The School of Industrial and Aeronautic Engineering of Terrassa or ETSEIAT (in Catalan Escola Tècnica Superior d'Enginyeries Industrial i Aeronàutica de Terrassa) is a public institution of higher education founded in 1904 and part of the Polytechnic University of Catalonia (UPC). It is located in Terrassa, about 1 hour from Barcelona, Spain.

Studies

Bachelor
 Bachelor's Degree in Industrial Technology Engineering
 Bachelor's Degree in Aerospace Technology Engineering
 Bachelor's Degree in Aerospace Vehicle Engineering

Master
 Master's Degree in Industrial Engineering
 Master's Degree in Aerospace Engineering
 Master's Degree in Management Engineering (taught in English)
 Master's Degree in Engineering of Automatic Systems and Power Electronics

PhD
 Mechanical Engineering, Fluids and Aeronautics
 Thermal Engineering
 Textile and Paper Engineering
 Optical Engineering
 Electric Energy Systems

Main figures
 19 UPC Basic Unities present
 2437 students
 310 teaching and research staff
 73 administration and services staff
 27 classrooms dedicated to teaching
 9 classrooms with PCs

External links
 Website of ETSEIAT
 Website of UPC

Engineering universities and colleges in Spain
Education in Barcelona
Universities in Catalonia
Polytechnic University of Catalonia